The Sieve is a river in Italy. It is a tributary of the Arno, into which it flows at Pontassieve after a course of 62 km. The Sieve rises in the Tuscan-Emilian Apennines, near the Futa Pass, at 930 m of elevation.

The territory in which it flows is known in Italian as Valdisieve. In Italian language, the name "Sieve" is feminine, and is therefore referred to as La Sieve.

Notes 

Rivers of Tuscany
Rivers of the Province of Florence
Rivers of Italy